For the year, see 471 or 471 BC
 For mathematical properties, see under 400 (number)

471 may also refer to:

 Highways numbered 471
 ČD Class 471 The Class 471 electric motor unit
 E471 glyceryl mono/distearate (food additive)